Lafayette Avenue may refer to:
 Lafayette Avenue (BMT Fulton Street Line)
 Lafayette Avenue (IND Fulton Street Line)
 Lafayette Avenue (Baltimore), a street in Baltimore